The Grand Prix Bern Inter, also known as the Grand Prix Bern Inter Curling Challenge, is an annual tournament on the men's World Curling Tour.  It is held annually on the last weekend of October or the first weekend of November at the Curlingbahn Allmend Bern in Bern, Switzerland.  

The purse for the event is CHF 18,100, with the winning team receiving CHF 5,500. 

The event has been held since 1997, and has been part of the World Curling Tour since 2018. 

Although it's a men's event, Andrea Schöpp won the event in 2010.

Champions
The champions for this event are as follows:

References

External links
Official website

World Curling Tour events
Curling competitions in Switzerland
Sports competitions in Bern